Afinișul River may refer to:

 Afinișul River, a tributary of the Bistriţa River in Romania
 Afinișul River, a tributary of the Nemțișor River in Romania